Cristina Gomes Fernandes  is Professor of Computer Science at the University of São Paulo.

Fernandes has a BSc in Computer Science from the University of São Paulo (1987), a MSc in Applied Mathematics from the University of São Paulo (1992) and a PhD in Computer Science from the Georgia Institute of Technology (1997), the title of her thesis was Approximation Algorithms for Planar and Highly Connected Subgraphs.

Her research focus lies in the research of combinatorial optimization, with emphasis on approximation algorithms, algorithm analysis and computational complexity.

References 

Living people
Year of birth missing (living people)
Academic staff of the University of São Paulo
Georgia Tech alumni
Brazilian women computer scientists

University of São Paulo alumni